Bichang (died 1854) of the Mongol Eledete clan, courtesy name Dongyuan and art name Xingquan, was a Qing dynasty official who served first in high-ranking posts in Xinjiang and later as Viceroy of Liangjiang under the Daoguang Emperor. He was also a writer, an accomplished poet, and a painter. His posthumous name was Qinxiang.

He was an ethnic Mongol of the Bordered Yellow Banner; both his father Heying and his son Hengfu were also important Qing officials.

Early career
The son of minister , Bichang began his civil service career as a clerk (bithesi) in the Ministry of Works. He then served as the county magistrate first in Yangwu County (now Yuanyang County, Henan) and later in Zaoqiang County. He was subsequently promoted and became the prefect of Daming Prefecture.

Northwest China
In 1827, Bichang was dispatched to Southern Xinjiang with Nayancheng, the Viceroy of Zhili, following the defeat of Jahangir Khoja. His father Heying served there many years before, and Bichang was likely familiar with the area and its administration. In 1829, he was promoted to Top-Grade Imperial Guard and Grand Minister Superintendent of Yarkant. In 1830, Bichang successfully defended Yarkant during the Āfāqī Khoja Holy War. He later detailed his experiences in Shoubian Jiyao and Ye'erqiang Shoucheng Jilüe. In these works, Bichang stressed the importance of unity between the Hui Muslims and Han Chinese, which was achieved through propaganda by imams and Begs. He also talked about the unreliability of Kyrgyz allies and how he involved the Uyghur people in his army. Also critical to his success were careful fortification and monitoring, the tuntian system, moving markets to the inside of the cities, and the acquisition of all necessary weaponry and equipments.

In 1831, he became the Grand Minister Consultant of Kashgar, and later that year, the Grand Minister Consultant of Yarkant. He was recalled to Beijing in late 1832. In 1834, he became the Grand Minister Superintendent of Uqturpan. A few months later, he went to Liangzhou Prefecture (in Gansu) to serve as its Deputy Commander-in-Chief. He returned to Xinjiang in 1837, as Grand Minister Superintendent of Aksu. After a brief stint as Commander-in-Chief of Chahar, he became the Grand Minister Consultant of Ili in 1840, and the Governor of Shaanxi in 1842.

Southeast China, retirement, and death
In November 1842, he was sent to Fuzhou to serve as its Commander; two years later he became the Viceroy of Liangjiang, which he officially assumed in January 1845. He returned to Beijing in March 1847 and was appointed Grand Minister of the Imperial Household Department a month later. He returned to Fuzhou and stayed there until early 1849, when he retired to his banner due to an illness.

In 1853, as Taiping rebel's Northern Expedition approached Beijing, Bichang was appointed Grand Minister Inspector but he died a year later.

Bibliography
Ye'erqiang Shoucheng Jilüe ("A Brief Account of Defending Cities in Yarkant", 1838)
Shoubian Jiyao ("A Summary of Guardding the Frontier", 1831), published in 1840 with sections added by his successor Ling Xiufeng
Bingwu Jianwenlu ("A Personal Account of the Military")
Muling Yaojue ("A Manual for Magistrates")
Bi Qinxiang Gong Yishu ("Posthumous Writings by Bichang, Lord Qinxiang")

Bichang's poetry collection, published as Bi Canshuai Shigao ("Poems by Bichang, the Consultant-Marshall") is now considered lost, but some of his poems on paintings have survived. He was also a known painter and could draw architectural diagrams.

References

19th-century Mongolian people
Qing dynasty governors of Shanxi
Mongolian Bordered Yellow Bannermen
Year of birth missing
1854 deaths